Douce violence may refer to:

 Douce violence (film)
 Douce violence (album)